"Once Upon a Dream" is a song written for the 1959 animated musical fantasy film Sleeping Beauty produced by Walt Disney. Its lyrics were written by Jack Lawrence and Sammy Fain while the music is adapted by George Bruns. The song's melody is based on the "Grande valse villageoise" (nicknamed "The Garland Waltz"), from the 1890 ballet The Sleeping Beauty by Pyotr Ilyich Tchaikovsky.

"Once Upon a Dream" serves as the film's main theme, and as the love theme of Princess Aurora and Prince Phillip. It is performed in the film by a chorus as an overture and third-reprise finale, as well as in a duet by Mary Costa and Bill Shirley, who voiced the roles of Aurora and Phillip, respectively.

Notable covers
American girl group No Secrets recorded the song "Once Upon (Another) Dream", whose chorus is based on "Once Upon a Dream", in 2003 for the two-disc DVD release of Sleeping Beauty. The song was then included in the 2004 compilation album Disneymania 2.

"Once Upon a Dream" was covered by Emily Osment in October 2008 for the Platinum Edition release of the film. Osment's rendition was included in the 2008 compilation album Princess Disneymania.

Seth MacFarlane covered the song for his 2020 show tunes album Great Songs from Stage & Screen.

Lana Del Rey version 

"Once Upon a Dream" was covered by American singer and songwriter Lana Del Rey for the dark fantasy film Maleficent (2014), which serves as a re-imagining of the original 1959 film. The song was released on January 26, 2014; it was made available as a free digital download during its first week of availability by the Google Play Store. On February 4, the digital download was made available for purchase.

Critical reception 
The cover received generally positive reception. Forbes called the cover "moody and low-key" while Stereogum described it as "swoony" and "spaced-out". Hypable said the cover was "much darker" than the original and pointed out the "slight radio effect" over Del Rey's and called her performance of the song "haunting": Spin said of the song snippet from the trailer: "Smoky vocals, a bewitching come-hither delivery, and delicate piano turn the 1959 fairytale song into a haunting lullaby." Complex remarked that Del Rey's cover had a "somber and sinister" feel in comparison to the original.

Chart positions

Certifications

References

External links
  (on Disney's official channel)

1950s ballads
1959 songs
2014 singles
Disney songs
Sleeping Beauty (1959 film)
Emily Osment songs
Lana Del Rey songs
Love themes
Songs with music by Sammy Fain
Songs with lyrics by Jack Lawrence
Songs written for animated films
Songs written for films
Walt Disney Records singles
Male–female vocal duets
Pop ballads
Songs about dreams
Songs based on fairy tales